Koonwarria manifrons is an extinct genus of ray-finned fish that lived in a polar lake in what is now Koonwarra, Victoria, Australia during the Early Cretaceous epoch. Fossils have been retrieved from the Strzelecki Group.

Koonwarria manifrons shares many anatomical similarities with the family Archaeomaenidae, and is assumed to be descended from the archaeomaenids, but, is regarded as distinct enough to be placed in its own monotypic family, Koonwarriidae.

References

External links
 

Prehistoric teleostei
Prehistoric ray-finned fish genera
Cretaceous bony fish
Early Cretaceous fish
Early Cretaceous animals of Oceania
Early Cretaceous Australia
Cretaceous animals of Australia
Freshwater fish genera
†
†
Prehistoric fish of Australia
Early Cretaceous genus first appearances
Early Cretaceous genus extinctions
Fossil taxa described in 1971
Fish described in 1971